Chabri Bala چھابری بالا, also called Chabri is a village in Pakistan, located 9 kilometers north of Dera Ghazi Khan in the province of Punjab, Pakistan. 

Chabri Bala Means.. Upper Chabri. There is Chabri Zerein meaning Lower Chabri. Origin of name is still unclear.

Geography
It is located between Old Manka Canal and new d g khan canal. There is one Minor canal passing by Village. It has lush green scenery with skyrocketing agricultural land prices. Chabri balas population is about 3000 people and some scattered population of surroundings counting over all 20000 people. This Village is more than 100 years old.

It is occupied by mainly Mastoi Balouch Tribe. Village has its main gathering place called POLL meaning Bridge referring to a very old bridge on Manka canal with many local shops and amenities. Villagers gather to shop and socialize at this place.

Education

The village has
Four schools:
 one Boys High School,
 One Girls High School,
 One primary School.
 There is one Private school Offering English Medium Education.

Health

 There is One Qualified Doctor Clinic on Regular basis and  there are 4 Dispensaries
 Also a medical store (Mastoi Medical Store).
 There is one veterinary Clinic.

Although this village is fairly modern, it has many challenges including drinking water, an outdated sewage system, free health service and emergency Medical service.

This village has produced many prominent professionals working in Govt sector (e.g. Pakistan Atomic Energy Commission, Health, Education and Police department) Banking, Law and Business sectors due to its good infrastructure.

This village is politically divided and has many players and active figures.
 Crime rate has dramatically increased in recent years reflecting over all situation in the country.
 The village has a Cricket team which takes part in inter-village competition.

See also
Mastoi Industries Limited

References

Villages in Dera Ghazi Khan District
Union councils of Dera Ghazi Khan District